Woolly goat chicory is a common name for several plants and may refer to:

Agoseris apargioides
Agoseris hirsuta